Ram Mehar (born 24 May 1934) is an Indian athlete. He competed in the men's long jump at the 1956 Summer Olympics.

References

1934 births
Living people
Athletes (track and field) at the 1956 Summer Olympics
Athletes (track and field) at the 1958 British Empire and Commonwealth Games
Indian male long jumpers
Olympic athletes of India
Place of birth missing (living people)
Commonwealth Games competitors for India
20th-century Indian people